Beno Gutenberg (June 4, 1889 – January 25, 1960) was a German-American seismologist who made several important contributions to the science.  He was a colleague and mentor of Charles Francis Richter at the California Institute of Technology and Richter's collaborator in developing the Richter magnitude scale for measuring an earthquake's magnitude.

Early life, family and education
Gutenberg was born in Darmstadt, Germany. His father owned a factory.

He obtained his doctorate in physics from the University of Göttingen in 1911. His advisor was Emil Wiechert.

Career
During World War I, Gutenberg served in the German Army as a meteorologist in support of gas warfare operations.

Gutenberg held positions at the University of Strasbourg, which he lost when Strasbourg became French in 1918. After some years during which he had to sustain himself with managing his father's soap factory, he obtained in 1926 a junior professorship at University of Frankfurt-am-Main, which was poorly paid.

Although he was already, in the 1920s, one of the leading seismologists worldwide and definitely the leading seismologist in Germany, he was still dependent on the position in his father's factory; however, he continued his research in his spare time.

In 1928, the attempt to become the successor of his academic teacher, Emil Wiechert, in Göttingen, failed. There are hints that Gutenberg's Jewish background might have played a role because, already in the 1920s, there were strong antisemitic tendencies in German universities. For similar reasons, he was also not accepted for a professorship in Potsdam to become the successor of Gustav Angenheister.

Move to the US
Since Gutenberg could not sustain a career of scientific work in Germany, he accepted a position as Professor of Geophysics at the California Institute of Technology in Pasadena in 1930, becoming founding director of the Seismological Laboratory when it was transferred to Caltech from Carnegie. Even if he had obtained a full professorship in Germany, he would have lost it in 1933 anyway like so many other scientists of Jewish ancestry, at least 30 of whom emigrated to the United States under Gutenberg's sponsorship.

Gutenberg made the California Institute of Technology Seismological Laboratory the leading seismological institute worldwide, especially in his collaboration with Charles Francis Richter. Together, they developed a relationship between seismic magnitude and energy, represented in this equation:

which gives the energy  given from earthquakes from seismic waves in ergs. Another famous result, known as Gutenberg–Richter law, provides probability distribution of earthquakes for a given energy.

Gutenberg also worked on determining the depth of the core-mantle boundary as well as other properties of the interior of the earth.

In 1952, Gutenberg received the Prix Charles Lagrange from the Académie royale des Sciences, des Lettres et des Beaux-Arts de Belgique. Gutenberg remained director of the Seismological Laboratory until 1957. He was succeeded by Frank Press.

Works

See also
Seismicity
Core–mantle boundary
Lithosphere–asthenosphere boundary
Macroseismic magnitude
List of geophysicists

Notes

External links
Biography at the American Geophysical Union website
Biography at the European Geosciences Union website
Leon Knopoff on Gutenberg, National Academy of Science
Hertha Gutenberg Oral History, Caltech Archives
Biography of Beno Gutenberg by Leon Knopoff at Biographical Memoirs of the National Academy of Sciences, vol. 76 (1999)

American geophysicists
American seismologists
Fellows of the Seismological Society of America
American people of German-Jewish descent
1960 deaths
1889 births
German emigrants to the United States